For Investors Bank headquartered in New Jersey, see Investors Bank.

Investors Bank & Trust or IBT was a custodian bank, and the principal operating subsidiary of Investors Financial Services Corp., (previously ), a holding company based in Boston, Massachusetts. First founded in 1969 as an offshoot of Eaton Vance, the company was purchased by State Street Corporation in 2007 as an all-stock deal valued at nearly $4.5 billion and no longer operates as a separate listed company. State Street refers informally to the former IBT operation as "State Street Back Bay".

IBT's headquarters were located within the landmark John Hancock Tower designed by I.M. Pei, where it was chief tenant. Some of IBT's more well-known clients included Aegon, Barclays Global Investors, Eaton Vance, and MassMutual.

Office locations
Investors Financial Services had offices in Massachusetts, New York City, Sacramento, Toronto, Dublin, and Grand Cayman Island. The New York office had only 10 people, while the Grand Cayman Island office was only a post office address held for tax reasons.

Holdings
Investors Bank & Trust
Merrimac Money Market Funds

References

External links
Ibtco.com: Investors Bank & Trust website
Ibtco.com: Investors Bank & Trust Eyes to the World newsletter
Yahoo! Finance: Investors financial services company profile
Marketwatch.com: "State Street moves to buy Investors Financial"

Banks based in Massachusetts
Defunct banks of the United States
Companies based in Boston
Banks established in 1969
Banks disestablished in 2007
1969 establishments in Massachusetts
2007 establishments in Massachusetts
2007 mergers and acquisitions
Defunct companies based in Massachusetts